The Ghost of Thomas Kempe is a low fantasy novel for children by Penelope Lively, first published by Heinemann in 1973 with illustrations by Anthony Maitland. Set in present-day Oxfordshire, it features a boy and his modern family who are new in their English village, and seem beset by a poltergeist. Soon the boy makes acquaintance with the eponymous Thomas Kempe, ghost of a 17th-century resident sorcerer who intends to stay.

Lively won the annual Carnegie Medal from the Library Association, recognising the year's best children's book by a British subject.

Characters
Major characters
 James Harrison, the main character
 Mrs Harrison, James's mother
 Mr Harrison, James's father
 Helen Harrison, James's sister
 Tim the dog
 Thomas Kempe, the poltergeist who troubles James

Minor characters
 Simon, James's friend
 Bert, the local handyman who tries to deal with the poltergeist
 Mrs Verity, an old lady whom Thomas Kempe accuses of being a witch
 Arnold, a Victorian boy who experienced the ghost before James
 Aunt Fanny, Arnold's aunt
 Mr Hollings, James's teacher
 The vicar
 Julia, Helen's friend

Themes
An interest in history, the passage of time and local change is a running theme in the work of Penelope Lively and can be seen in many of her books. Beside Mr Kempe from the 17th century, this story involves both a 20th-century resident of the cottage and the history of the surrounding countryside.

Adaptations
In 1978, a film was made based on the novel, which aired on the ABC Weekend Special, a showcase for a variety of different films aimed at children. The film was re-broadcast many times over the years, and has had several releases on home video, and is currently hosted on YouTube. The book was also read on BBC's Jackanory. In 1977, a radio play version was aired over a number of weeks on Australia's ABC radio. In 1978 the book was adapted as a radio play by the Norwegian Broadcasting Corporation.

Notes

References

External links
  —immediately, 1973 US edition 
 
 Comfort reading: The Ghost Of Thomas Kempe, by Penelope Lively
 1979 US TV Movie (YouTube)

1973 British novels
1973 children's books
British children's novels
Ghost novels
Carnegie Medal in Literature winning works
Novels by Penelope Lively
Novels set in Oxfordshire
Heinemann (publisher) books
British novels adapted into films
ABC Weekend Special